Propanedithiol may refer to:

 1,2-Propanedithiol
 1,3-Propanedithiol